Sniper: Ultimate Kill is a 2017 American action film directed by Claudio Fäh and starring Chad Michael Collins, Billy Zane, and Tom Berenger. The film is the seventh installment of the Sniper film series and a sequel to Sniper: Ghost Shooter (2016). It was released direct-to-video on October 3, 2017.

Plot
Colombian drug kingpin Jesús Morales hires a skilled sniper known as "El Diablo" to eliminate all of his enemies, enabling him to gain more control over routes for smuggling drugs into the United States. Kate Estrada, a DEA agent, was sent to Colombia with Master Sergeant Brandon Beckett to stop "El Diablo" and extradite Morales.

Cast

 Chad Michael Collins as Master Sergeant Brandon Beckett
 Billy Zane as Major Richard Miller
 Tom Berenger as Master Gunnery Sergeant Tom Beckett
 Joe Lando as Agent John Samson
 Danay García as Kate Estrada
 Jaime Correa as Father Garcia
 Luis Alfredo Velazco  as Captain Garza
 Andrés Felipe Calero as Enrique / El Diablo
 Juan Sebastián Calero as Jésus Morales
 Diana Hoyos as Maria Ramos

References

External links

2017 action films
2017 films
Direct-to-video sequel films
Films about snipers
Films directed by Claudio Fäh
Films scored by Frederik Wiedmann
Films about the United States Marine Corps
American action films
Sniper (film series)
Destination Films films
Sony Pictures direct-to-video films
Films set in Miami
Films shot in Colombia
Films set in Colombia
2010s English-language films
2010s American films